Deobandi is a term used for a revivalist movement  in Islam. It is centered primarily in India, Pakistan, Afghanistan and Bangladesh and has recently spread to the United Kingdom and has a presence in South Africa. The name derives from Deoband, India, where the school, Darul Uloom Deoband, is situated. The movement was inspired by the spirit of scholar Shah Waliullah (1703–1762), while the foundation of Darul Uloom Deoband was laid on 30 May 1866. Darul Ulum was the epicenter of the protest against the occupation of British East India company and the British Raj. 

There are many Deobandi universities in a variety of countries. The names of the countries are arranged in alphabetical order.

Bangladesh

Canada

India

Pakistan

South Africa

United Kingdom

United States

West Indies

Saudi Arabia

See also 
List of Deobandi organisations

References

External links
 Darul Uloom Deoband
 Jamia Binoria International
 Online Islamic Fatwa
 Jamia Qurania Arabia Lalbagh
 Islamic QA with Mufti Ebrahim Desai
 Deobandi Ulama's movement for freedom of India

Deobandi Islamic universities and colleges
Deobandi-related lists